Changing Hands is a solo album by pianist Paul Bley recorded in 1991 and released on the Justin Time label.

Reception

The Allmusic site awarded the album 3 out of 5 stars.

Track listing
All compositions by Paul Bley except as indicated
 "Changing Hands" - 6:50
 "Juanita" - 7:58
 "Willow" - 6:37
 "Longer" - 9:29
 "Summertime" - 6:58
 "U-Nighted" - 6:58
 "Pleasing You" - 2:50

Personnel
 Paul Bley – piano

References

Justin Time Records albums
Paul Bley albums
Solo piano jazz albums
1991 albums